The Central District of Charam County is a district (bakhsh) in Charam County, Kohgiluyeh and Boyer-Ahmad Province, Iran. At the 2006 census, its population was 24,989, in 4,682 families.  The District has one city: Charam. The District has two rural districts (dehestan): Alqchin Rural District and Charam Rural District.

References 

Districts of Kohgiluyeh and Boyer-Ahmad Province
Charam County